Colombi Hotel is a luxury hotel in Freiburg im Breisgau, Germany. The hotel is located in the city center of Freiburg, on the Rotteckring, opposite to the Colombipark and its Colombischlössle, from which the hotel got its name.

Since 1995, Colombi Hotel is a member of the alliance "The Leading Hotels of the World". The adjoining gourmet restaurant Zirbelstube has been awarded a Michelin star every year since 1983.

In 2011, Heinz Hoenig was in TV show "Make me happy" in some scenes in the Colombi Hotel. In the George-Roy Hill film "The Dragonfly" (1984), the Colombi Hotel was one of the filming locations.

History

The hotel was opened in June 1957. On the occasion of the 500th anniversary of the University of Freiburg, prominent guests from politics and business were welcomed in the same year. Saudi Arabian King Saud bin Abdulaziz Al Saud and his entourage spent several days at the Colombi Hotel in 1959.

External links
 Colombi Hotel Homepage

Hotels established in 1957
Hotel buildings completed in 1957
1957 establishments in West Germany
Hotels in Germany
Buildings and structures in Freiburg im Breisgau